Barrio de Buenos Aires is a locality located in the municipality of Bustillo del Páramo, in León province, Castile and León, Spain. As of 2020, it has a population of 22.

Geography 
Barrio de Buenos Aires is located 37km southwest of León, Spain.

References

Populated places in the Province of León